Kimberly Swift (born ) is an American video game designer best known for her work at Valve with games such as Portal and Left 4 Dead. Swift was featured by Fortune as one of "30 Under 30" influential figures in the video game industry. She was described in Mental Floss as one of the most recognized women in the industry and by Wired as "an artist that will push the medium forward".

Career
A graduate of DigiPen, Kim Swift and a group of her fellow graduates developed Narbacular Drop, a portal-based game that was later presented to Valve, which led to Gabe Newell personally offering to hire them so that they could create the critically acclaimed game Portal.  Kim Swift was the leader of the Portal team as well as a level designer. She was credited along with writer Erik Wolpaw in Portal'''s Game Developers Choice Awards for design, innovation, and game of the year.

Besides Portal, Swift has been involved in other Valve projects, most notably Left 4 Dead and its sequel, Left 4 Dead 2, where she also played a leading role in development.

In December 2009, Swift left Valve to join Airtight Games.  There, in cooperation with Square Enix, she led the team that developed Quantum Conundrum, which released in 2012. In a 2012, in an interview with Wired, Swift expressed the opinion that the most important impact of video games is that they are "a socially acceptable way for adults to imagine".

Amazon announced in April 2014 that they had brought Swift in to help build games in their internal studio. Swift described her role as senior designer for as yet undisclosed projects. In January 2017, Electronic Arts announced they have hired Swift as a design director within their Motive Studios, who developed Star Wars Battlefront II.

Swift had been part of the Google Stadia internal development studio, Stadia Games & Entertainment, as a game design director, until Google closed down the studio in February 2021. By June 2021, Swift had been hired by Xbox Game Studios Publishing as the senior director of cloud gaming. She helmed efforts within the division to provide cloud-native support for games that help to offload parts of processing from a user's own system, such as complex multiplayer portions of a game.

Swift hosted the 20th Game Developers Choice Awards ceremony on March 18, 2020.

 Summary & Impact 

Kimberly Swift knew that she wanted to make video games junior year of high school. She was introduced to DigiPen by her dad who suggested she apply for the Real Time Interactive Simulation (RTIS) program which required a good math and science background. Kimberly Swift attended DigiPen Institute of Technology where she worked on a portal-based game called Narbacular Drop. Swift’s final team for Narbacular Drop consisted of Jeep, Garret, Dave, and artists Realm, Paul, and Scott. In the meantime, Swift was interviewing for a job with Crystal Dynamics. Yet, when this game was presented to Valve, an American video game developer, publisher, and digital distribution company, Kim Swift was hired to both lead the Portal team and be a level designer. Kim developed an exemplary level design for Portal which required many repetitions of Design-Test-Iterate and playtesting. Her game was featured in Best Of The Decade list. She received Game Developers Choice Awards for design, innovation, and game of the year with her colleague writer Erik Wolpaw.
 
Swift continued to lead development for various projects at Valve such as Left 4 Dead, Left 4 Dead 2, etc. After, Swift decided to change companies and joined Airtight Games, an American independent video game developer. She utilized the higher position at Airtight Games relative to her position at Valve to lead more development efforts aimed towards a more diverse audience. At Airtight Games, she led the development of Quantum Conundrum. In April 2014, Swift was hired by Amazon Game studios. Following January 2017, Electronic Arts recruited Swift as the director of design for their Motive Studio. At Electronic Arts, she helped develop Star Wars Battlefront II. From there, Swift had also taken part in Google Stadia internal development studio as the director of game design. In June 2021, Xbox Game Studios Publishing hired Swift as the senior director of cloud gaming. 
 
Swift is known for her innovations in the American video game industry. Her most notable works are games such as Left 4 Dead, Quantum Conundrum, and Portal, a puzzle video game. While many game creators want video games to be more than just games but rather a work of art, Swift acknowledges this idea but dismisses it with a rather interesting categorization. Instead, Swift sternly categorizes her video game creations as “toys” rather than art. In an interview conducted by Wired, Swift emphasizes that she feels video games seem to be limited to certain people or stereotypes. She rather refers to video games as toys because they allow anyone, even adults, to use their imagination when playing. Swift says “They allow us to be a kid again. What’s great about games, in particular, is that it’s a socially acceptable way for adults to imagine.”  Focusing specifically on her creation of Portal, Swift intends for the end user to venture through a fantasy which encourages older generations to use their imaginations and essentially openly “play with toys.” 
 
Swift’s development of Portal communicated to game developers that games with high-production values, a few cool ideas, and higher price points can still succeed. As the lead designer, Kim utilized the both power of narratives and fascinating extra-dimensional passage features to engage her audience. Portal ended up selling over 4 million copies at retail, not including digital sales. The Museum of Modern Art selected Portal as one of the fourteen games to be included in their permanent collection. Swift was immediately recognized in Forbes 30 Under 30 for her amazing designs and game development. In her interview with John Walker in Eurogamer, Swift highlights her goal: “games seem to be split into two categories, either they're kids' games and have a low production bar and don't have a lot there for adults to have fun with. Or they're a big-budget game with a lot of substance but a lot of violence that isn't appropriate for kids. I think there's a happy medium in between where there's a little bit of something for everyone, like a good Pixar film. I definitely hope to try to make games that are more accessible to a broader audience.”  Her innovations are still in use. Though some games may not be as popular as others, many still stay in the hearts of gamers. Portal is one of her most celebrated game of the last decade. Her concepts and tested ideas provide a template for possible future video game developments. 
Games
 Narbacular Drop (2005)
 Half-Life 2: Episode One (2006)
 Portal (2007)
 Half-Life 2: Episode Two (2007)
 Portal: Still Alive (2008)
 Left 4 Dead (2008)
 Left 4 Dead 2 (2009)
 Quantum Conundrum (2012)
 PIXLD (2012) 
 Soul Fjord (2014) 
 Star Wars Battlefront II'' (2017)

References

1983 births
Amazon (company) people
American video game designers
Electronic Arts employees
Living people
Valve Corporation people
Women video game designers
Place of birth missing (living people)